The Monument to the Women of World War II is a British national war memorial situated on Whitehall in London, to the north of the Cenotaph. It was first thought of and funded by Peri Langdale, sculpted by John W. Mills, unveiled by Queen Elizabeth II and dedicated by Baroness Boothroyd in July 2005.

Fundraising was conducted by a charitable trust set up for the purpose of establishing a memorial, with the National Heritage Memorial Fund donating towards the project. Baroness Boothroyd also raised money on the game show Who Wants to Be a Millionaire?.

Origins
The idea for a memorial was raised with retired Major David Mcnally Robertson in 1997, who was informed that, while many countries had a national monument to the work that women undertook during World War Two, the UK did not.  Previous campaigns had only been limited to attempting to generate funds for a plaque in York Minster with Robertson, and former gunners Edna Storr and Mildred Veal leading the campaign.  They founded a fundraising trust together with Bill Moralee and Peri Langdale, journalist and ITV documentary producer. Speaker of the House of Commons Baroness Boothroyd, Dame Vera Lynn and the Princess Royal joining. Boothroyd became patron of the trust, with Dame Vera and Princess Royal coming vice–patrons.  The remaining vice–patrons were John Grogan, MP for Selby; Hugh Bayley, the MP for City of York; Baroness Finlay of Llandaff and Robert Crawford.

Over £300,000 was raised by the public. The National Heritage Memorial Fund then gave £934,115 towards the cost of the bronze sculpture to celebrate its 25th anniversary, while £800,000 was raised by Baroness Boothroyd who chose the fund as when she appeared on the ITV game show Who Wants to Be a Millionaire? in 2002. The remaining funds were raised by the Memorial to the Women of World War II Fund, a charitable fund based in York.

Design

The initial design involved a female Air Raid Warden sheltering children; however, this was simplified until the final design was created. The lettering on the sides replicates the typeface used on war time ration books. There are 17 individual sets of clothing and uniforms around the sides, symbolising the hundreds of different jobs women undertook in World War II and then gave back for the homecoming men at the end of the war. These outfits include uniforms as worn by the Women's Land Army, Women's Royal Naval Service, a nursing cape, a police overall and a welding mask.

Unveiling
The memorial was unveiled on 9 July 2005, two days after the 7/7 London bombings, by Queen Elizabeth II as part of the 60th anniversary of the end of the Second World War.  Also in attendance at the ceremony were Baroness Boothroyd, Baroness Thatcher, Dame Vera Lynn and the Defence Secretary John Reid as well as a number of female war veterans.  These veterans included Nancy Wake, the Allies' most decorated servicewoman.  A flypast of five military helicopters took place, an Apache, Sea King, Lynx, Chinook and Merlin, which were flown by all-female crews. This was followed by a flypast of two Panavia Tornado ADVs, flown by female pilots.

Baroness Boothroyd, patron of the Women of World War II trust and former Speaker of the House of Commons, dedicated the memorial saying: "This monument is dedicated to all the women who served our country and to the cause of freedom, in uniform and on the home front. I hope that future generations who pass this way will ask themselves: 'what sort of women were they?' and look at our history for the answer."

Vandalism
In May 2015, after the Conservative Party won a majority in a general election, the memorial was vandalised with red graffiti.  Downing Street called the damage "despicable", and at least 17 people were arrested following clashes in Whitehall.

See also
 Monroe v Hopkins, a libel case concerning the damage to the Monument.
 Women in World War II

References

External links

 Construction of Monument on John W Mills website
 Unveiling & Dedication Ceremony on John W Mills's website
 Official website of the Monument

2005 sculptures
Bronze sculptures in the United Kingdom
British Empire in World War II
Buildings and structures completed in 2005
Memorials, war
History of women in the United Kingdom
Home front during World War II
Military memorials in London
Monuments and memorials to women
Tourist attractions in the City of Westminster
United Kingdom in World War II
Whitehall

World War II memorials in England
Vandalized works of art in the United Kingdom